The Eccentric or The Odd One is a 1929 German silent comedy film directed by Walter Jerven and starring Karl Valentin,  Liesl Karlstadt, and Truus Van Aalten. It was made at the Emelka Studios in Munich.

Cast

References

Bibliography

External links 
 

1929 films
1929 comedy films
German comedy films
Films of the Weimar Republic
German silent feature films
German black-and-white films
Films shot at Bavaria Studios
Silent comedy films
1920s German films
Eccentricity (behavior)
1920s German-language films